The Illinois College of Optometry (ICO) is a private optometry college in Chicago, Illinois. Graduating approximately 160 optometrists a year, it is the largest optometry college in the United States and the oldest continually operating educational facility dedicated solely to the teaching of optometrists. The college complex incorporates more than  including an on-site eye care clinic, electronically enhanced lecture center, library, computerized clinical learning equipment, cafeteria, fitness center, and living facilities.

Facilities

The Illinois Eye Institute (IEI) is the principal clinical training facility for ICO students and is located adjacent to the college. In addition to primary eye care, sub-specialty care is available including glaucoma, retina-vitreous, neuro-ophthalmic disorders, cornea-external disease, orbit-oculoplastics, pediatrics/strabismus-amblyopia and low vision rehabilitation. Additional service areas within the IEI include The Alfred and Sarah Rosenbloom Center on Vision and Aging, Diabetic Eye Center, and Bronzeville Pharmacy. The IEI serves as a center for clinical research involving eye and vision problems including glaucoma, age-related macular degeneration (ARMD), cornea and contact lenses, and pediatric eye disorders.

Academics 

The Illinois College of Optometry awards the degrees of Doctor of Optometry (O.D.) and Bachelor of Science in Visual Science (BSVS). The College also offers a joint program with the Department of Ophthalmology and Visual Sciences at the University of Chicago to obtain an O.D. Degree and a Master of Science (M.S.) or Doctor of Philosophy (Ph.D.) degree. In addition, the college also offers a joint program with the Illinois Institute of Technology, where a student may obtain a BS in biology from IIT and an O.D. degree from the Illinois College of Optometry.

Notable alumni
 Donald L. Iverson, member of the Wisconsin State Assembly
 Bob Whittaker, U.S. Representative from Kansas
 Otto Frederick Rohwedder, Inventor of Bread Slicing Machine
 Chelsea Laden, Retired Ice Hockey Goal Keeper and Destination Fear (2019 TV series) Host

References

External links
 

1872 establishments in Illinois
Educational institutions established in 1872
Optometry schools in the United States
Universities and colleges in Chicago
Private universities and colleges in Illinois